Tomasz Świst (born 23 December 1974) is a Polish speed skater. He was born in Nowy Targ. He competed at the 1998 Winter Olympics in Nagano, and at the 2002 Winter Olympics in Salt Lake City, both times in 500 metres and 1,000 metres.

References

External links

1974 births
Living people
Polish male speed skaters
People from Nowy Targ
Sportspeople from Lesser Poland Voivodeship
Speed skaters at the 1998 Winter Olympics
Speed skaters at the 2002 Winter Olympics
Olympic speed skaters of Poland